Stigmella szoecsiella is a moth of the family Nepticulidae. It is found in Hungary, Italy, Greece and Turkey.

The wingspan is 4.7-5.2 mm. Adults are on wing from June to August.

The larvae feed on Quercus cerris and Quercus trojana. They mine the leaves of their host plant. The mine consists of a fairly slender corridor. The frass is concentrated in a central band that occupies about two thirds of the width of the gallery.

External links
Fauna Europaea
bladmineerders.nl
The Quercus Feeding Stigmella Species Of The West Palaearctic: New Species, Key And Distribution (Lepidoptera: Nepticulidae)

Nepticulidae
Moths of Europe
Moths described in 1972